Castlemaine railway station is located on the Deniliquin line in Victoria, Australia. It serves the town of Castlemaine, and it opened on 21 October 1862.

The station is also the termini of the Maldon and Moolort lines, but no passenger revenue services currently operates on the latter line, with the Victorian Goldfields Railway operating heritage services on the Maldon line.

In 1973, a turntable at the station was abolished. On 9 July 1977, the passenger service to Maryborough was withdrawn, and in 1978, a number of points were abolished, as was a crossover and the former carriage dock.

Rationalisation of the former yard occurred during the late 1980s. In 1989, signal boxes "A" and "B" were abolished, and replaced with a signal panel within the station office. Mechanical points were also abolished, and all signals were replaced with two and three position signals. Also in that year, boom barriers replaced interlocked gates at the Parker Street level crossing, located nearby in the Down direction of the station.

On 17 December 2004, the Victorian Goldfields Railway was extended from Muckleford to Castlemaine. On 17 January 2005, the signal panel was abolished.

Disused stations Elphinstone and Taradale are located between Castlemaine and Malmsbury, while disused stations Harcourt and Ravenswood are located between Castlemaine and Kangaroo Flat. Demolished station Chewton was also located between Castlemaine and Malmsbury.

Platforms and services

Castlemaine has one island platform with two faces (Platforms 2 and 3) and one side platform (Platform 1). Platforms 1 and 2 are used by V/Line Bendigo, Echuca and Swan Hill line services in both directions, while Platform 3 is used by Victorian Goldfields Railway heritage services to Maldon.

Platform 1:
 services to Bendigo, Epsom, Eaglehawk, Echuca, Swan Hill and Southern Cross

Platform 2:
 services to Bendigo, Epsom, Eaglehawk, Echuca, Swan Hill and Southern Cross

Platform 3:
 Victorian Goldfields Railway heritage services to Maldon

Transport links

Castlemaine Bus Lines operates five routes via Castlemaine station, under contract to Public Transport Victoria:
: Castlemaine – Campbells Creek
: Castlemaine Town Loop
: to Maldon
: to Taradale
: to Chewton

References

External links

Victorian Railway Stations gallery
 Castlemaine and Maldon Junction Victorian Station Histories
Melway map at street-directory.com.au

Railway stations in Australia opened in 1862
Regional railway stations in Victoria (Australia)
Victoria (Australia) tourist railway stations